Dunford is a surname. Notable people with the surname include:

 Abby Dunford (born 2006), Canadian-American swimmer
 Christine Dunford (born 20th century), American actress
 Clint Dunford (1943–2021), Canadian politician
 Colin Dunford (born 1994), Irish hurler
 David Dunford (born 1988), Kenyan swimmer
 Jake Dunford (born 1994), Jersey cricketer
 Jason Dunford (born 1986), Kenyan swimmer, media personality etc.
 Jesse Dunford Wood (born 20th century), English chef and restaurateur
 Jim Dunford (1930–1982), Australian trade unionist and politician 
 Jonathan Dunford (born 1959), American violist, father of Thomas
 Joseph Dunford (born 1955), US Marine Corps general
 Malcolm Dunford (born 1963), New Zealand association football player
 Matt Dunford (born 1968), Australian rugby league footballer
 Michael Dunford (born 1953), English football administrator
 Moe Dunford (born 1987), Irish actor
 Nelson Dunford (1906–1986), American mathematician
 Noel Dunford (born 1939), Canadian football player
 Thomas Dunford (born 1988), French lutenist, son of Jonathan
 Warren Dunford (born 1963), Canadian writer

See also
 Dunford–Pettis property (Nelson Dunford)
 Dunford–Schwartz theorem (Nelson Dunford)